Aranka Szeiler (5 May 1909 – 31 January 1982) was a Hungarian gymnast. She competed in the women's artistic team all-around event at the 1928 Summer Olympics.

References

External links
 

1909 births
1982 deaths
Hungarian female artistic gymnasts
Olympic gymnasts of Hungary
Gymnasts at the 1928 Summer Olympics
Gymnasts from Budapest